Tom Frederikse is an electronic music producer who has performed remix work for Sasha in the early-1990s on Sasha's single "Appolonia" as well as working with him on records including The Qat Collection.  He has also done work for D:Ream other large labels such as Atlantic Records and Virgin Records UK.  He also co-authored "How to DJ : The Insider's Guide to Success on the Decks".

External links

Living people
Year of birth missing (living people)
Place of birth missing (living people)
Record producers